Dunkeswell is a village and civil parish in East Devon, England, located about  north of the town of Honiton.  At the 2001 census, the parish had a population of 1,553, reducing to 1,361 at the 2011 Census. There is an electoral ward with the same name whose population at the above census was 2,000. The parish is surrounded, clockwise from the north, by the parishes of Hemyock, Luppitt, Combe Raleigh, Awliscombe, Broadhembury and Sheldon.

History
Dunkeswell is notable for having a busy small airfield, now Dunkeswell Aerodrome which was initially established as an American Navy air base during World War II, and continues to offer civil flight services to this day.

The church, restored in 1868 from an older foundation, is of interest for its Norman font.

Dunkeswell Eco Business Park, located near the aerodrome, was constructed to provide environmentally-friendly business space for start-up businesses, businesses who are considered to be at a disadvantage such as those run by younger owners or women, and businesses that have outgrown existing premises.

Dunkeswell was the birthplace of the Canadian clergyman Henry Scadding.

Climate
The highest recorded temperature since 1990 was 28.3 °C on 2 and 8 July 2018 and the lowest was -7.8 °C on 2 January 1997.

Dunkeswell Abbey
The abbey was founded in 1201 by William Briwere as a Cistercian monastery and offshoot of Forde Abbey. The founder granted much property within Devon to the abbey. Around two years before his death in 1226, he entered the community and was eventually buried in front of the high altar of the abbey church.

Following the Dissolution of the Monasteries the abbey was closed in 1539 and granted to John Russell, 1st Baron Russell (1485–1555), later 1st Earl of Bedford, and was mostly demolished quickly, though a section remained in domestic use until the 19th century. In 1842, a parish church was built over part of the site. Some surviving fragments of monastery include the partial end wall of the cellarer's range and parts of a gatehouse. Some carved fragments survive within Holy Trinity Church which was built here in 1842 in Early English style.

See also
Wolford Chapel

References 

 New, Anthony A Guide to the Abbeys of England and Wales, p. 156-157. Constable.

External links

Dunkeswell Abbey Website
Dunkeswell at Streetmap.co.uk
Dunkeswell Memorial Museum
uk-genealogy.org Information and pictures of Holy Trinity Church and the Abbey ruins

Cistercian monasteries in England
Monasteries in Devon
Religious organizations established in the 1200s
1539 disestablishments in England
Christian monasteries established in the 13th century
Villages in Devon
1201 establishments in England